Olive Township is one of sixteen townships in Elkhart County, Indiana. As of the 2010 census, its population was 3,068.

History
Olive Township was organized in 1836.

Geography

Cities and towns
 Wakarusa (north three-quarters)

Adjacent townships
 Baugo Township (north)
 Concord Township (northeast)
 Harrison Township (east)
 Union Township (southeast)
 Locke Township (south)
 Madison Township, St. Joseph County (west)
 Penn Township, St. Joseph County (northwest)

Major highways

Cemeteries
The township contains two cemeteries: Pletcher and Shutts.

Education
Olive Township residents are eligible to obtain a library card at the Wakarusa-Olive & Harrison Township Public Library in Wakarusa.

References
 United States Census Bureau cartographic boundary files
 U.S. Board on Geographic Names

External links
 Indiana Township Association
 United Township Association of Indiana

Townships in Elkhart County, Indiana
Townships in Indiana